Aruzhan Kassenova (born 1 December 2006)  is a Kazakh rhythmic gymnast, member of the national group.

Career 
Kassenova debuted into the senior national group at the 2022 World Cup in Athens where she was 4th in the All-Around and with 3 ribbons and 2 balls, winning bronze with 5 hoops. A month later in Tashkent the group won silver in the All-Around and with 3 ribbons and 2 balls as well as bronze with 5 hoops. A week later she competed in Baku with the group, taking 7th place in the All-Around and won bronze with 3 ribbons and 2 balls. In June she took part in the World Cup in Pesaro, ending 8th in the All-Around and with 3 balls and 2 balls, 6th with 5 hoops. From June 23 to 26 the group participated at the 2022 Asian Rhythmic Gymnastics Championships in Pattaya, winning gold with 5 hoops, silver in teams and bronze in the group All-Around. In August Aruzhan competed at the 2021 Islamic Solidarity Games in Konya where the group won bronze in the All-Around and with 5 hoops. In September Kassenova took part in the World Championships in Sofia along Sagina Muratkyzy, Aidana Shakenova, Assel Shukirbay, Renata Zholdinova, and the two individuals Elzhana Taniyeva and Aibota Yertaikyzy, taking 24th place in the All-Around, 26th with 5 hoops and 21st with 3 ribbons + 2 balls.

References 

Living people
2006 births
Kazakhstani rhythmic gymnasts